The Basilica di San Calimero is a church in Milan, northern Italy. Its name refers to Saint Calimerius (died 190 AD), an early bishop of the city.  It dates from the 5th century but was almost completely rebuilt in 1882 by the architect Angelo Colla in an attempt to restore it to the "original" medieval structure. 

What remains of the ancient church include: the 16th century crypt, with a noble frescoed vault by the Fiammenghini; a small fresco with the Madonna and Two Female Saints (15th century, attributed to Cristoforo Moretti) in the apse; a Crucifixion by Il Cerano, and a noteworthy Nativity by Marco d'Oggiono. Other medieval frescoes are in the annexed sacristy.

The crypt also houses Calimerius' relics and a pit located in the same place in which the former's bones were found in the water.

See also
 Early Christian churches in Milan

Dioceses established in the 5th century
Calimero, Basilica di San
Roman Catholic churches completed in 1882
5th-century churches
Gothic architecture in Lombardy
Tourist attractions in Milan
19th-century Roman Catholic church buildings in Italy